Puthenvelikara is a village at North end of the Ernakulam district, situated in the Paravur Taluk of Kerala, India. The Chalakkudy River merges with the Periyar River at Elenthikara in the village of Puthenvelikkara. Puthenvelikkara is on the banks of the river Periyar, Chalakudy and Kottapuram lagoon. It is a centre of agricultural production in the region with its many rice paddy fields.

Location
Puthenvelikkara is near Paravur and Mala. The nearest town to this village is North Paravur, which is approximately 5 km away and is connected to the village via a bridge named 'Station Kadavu' bridge. It is located 33 km North from District headquarters Kakkanad, 9 km from Parakkadavu, and 238 km from State capital Thiruvananthapuram. Puthenvelikkara Pin code is 683594 and postal head office is Puthenvelikara.
               	
Blessed with scenic splendor, Puthenvelikara is on the banks of the river Periyar and Chalakudy and Kottapuram Kayal. Lagoons were born out of the influence of natural forces like high tide.

History
The name could be interpreted as "the land formed due to high tides". Fossils of sea life, wooden remnants and other debris that came up while digging the town's earth support the theory of its origin. Similar land formed due to high tides can be found in various places in the small state of Kerala. Years ago foreign ships were launched on the north side of Puthenvelikkara, now known as 'Kappalkulam'.

Geography
Puthenvelikkara is situated in Ernakulam District of Central Kerala in India. The village is 29 km North of Kochi and 21 km west of the Cochin International Airport. The Territory of Puthenvelikkara covers an area of 19.87 km2. Puthenvelikkara shares its borders with Poyya and Methala villages in the North, Karumalloor and Kunnukara villages in the South, Prakkadavu, Kunnukara and Kuzhur villages in the East, and Chendamangalam, Vadakkekara and Methala villages in the West. The ancient belief is that, the formation of the village is a result of high-tide (Veliyettam in Malayalam) and this belief is proven by the existence of fossil  of aquatic beings found in the village.

Puthenvelikkara is surrounded by water bodies such as rivers and lagoons. It resulted in the formation of fertile lands suited for cultivation. The primary source of income for the people of the village is agriculture. The provinces or wards such as Kurisingal, Kurumba thuruth, Thuruthipuram, Thuruthur, Panjipalla, ManancheriKunnu (aka SkyleanHill), Karottukara, Vattekattu Kunnu, Keezhuppadam, Kodikuthiya Kunnu, Elanthikara, Kanakkankadav, Cherukadappuram, Thelathuruth, Kozhithuruth, Chowkakadav, Malavana, Stationkadav and some small islands, together form the village of Puthenvelikkara. Puthenvelikkara was famous in Paravur for its numerous Kunnu\Hills, but today they have been destroyed for productive purposes in Paravur.

The new bridge linking Puthenvelikkara with the mainland was opened to traffic in June, 2018 by Works Minister G Sudhakaran. Built at  Valiyapazham-Pallithuruthu,  the bridge is a boon to the people of Puthenvelikakra who lacked proper connectivity to nearby areas due to the lack of adequate infrastructure facilities. The Station Kadavu-Valiya Pazham Pallithuruthu bridge had been the long-standing demand of the people of Puthenvelikkara, and the residents can reach Ernakulam and Paravur easily. Following the construction of the bridge, one can reach Chendamangalam and Paravur in just 10 minutes and it will cost them only `10 by way of bus fare. The construction of the bridge started in 2010.

Civic administration
Puthenvelikkara belongs to North Paravoor block Panchayat. Puthenvelikkara comes under Vadakkekara circle and has a police station.

Puthenvelikkara Census Town has total administration over 8,379 houses to which it supplies basic amenities like water and sewerage. It is also authorised to build roads within Census Town limits and impose taxes on properties coming under its jurisdiction.

Demographics
According to the 2001 India census, Puthenvelikkara has a population of 32,213, consisting of 15,658 males and 16,555 females. Peaceful coexistence of Hindu and Christian communities makes this village a role model for the entire state. The village once had few Jewish families settled here, but none remain. Notably, there are no Muslims residing in this village. Population of Children with age of 0-6 is 3073 which is 9.21% of total population of Puthenvelikkara (CT). In Puthenvelikkara Census Town, Female Sex Ratio is of 1054 against state average of 1084. Moreover, Child Sex Ratio in Puthenvelikkara is around 904 compared to Kerala state average of 964. Literacy rate of Puthenvelikkara city is 94.87% higher than state average of 94.00%. In Puthenvelikkara, Male literacy is around 96.58% while female literacy rate is 93.28%.

Education
Colleges
Presentation college of applied sciences, Puthenvelikkara,
IHRD college of applied sciences

Schools
V.C.S.H.S.S, Puthenvelikkara (State Board)
St. Antony's English Medium School, Karottukara
M.M.N.S.S, English medium School, Puthenvelikkara (CBSE)
Elenthikara High School, Elenthikara
Mary Ward English Medium School, Puthenvelikkara (ICSE)
St. Joseph High School, Chathedam
 Sreesarada vidyamandir, elenthikara, Sainik Syllabus school

Hospitals
Government Hospital, Puthenvelikkara
Assisi Hospital(AAJM Hospital), Thuruthipuram
Ayurvedic Hospital, Manancherikunnu, Puthenvelikkara
Govt. Homeopathy Hospital Kanakkenkadavue
Veterinary Hospital, Puthenvelikkara

Places of religion
Temples in Puthenvelikkara
Karottu Sreekrishna Temple
Kurunnilaykal bhagavathy temple
Kattunilath Sree Subramanya swami Temple
Malavana Siva Temple
Edayattukavu bhagavathy temple
Dhandayudhapani temple, kalleparambu
Aveth Sree subrahmanya swami Temple
Paikkattu thrikka sreekrishna temple
Kuttikattu Madom Ganapathi Temple
Mattappilli Bhagavathi Nagaraja Temple

Churches in Puthenvelikkara:
Thuruthur St.Thomas Church
Malavana St. George's Church
Cherukadapuram Fathima Matha Church
Manancherikunnu St. Paul's Church
Assisi Bhavan Retreat Centre and Charity Home Assisi Bhavan
Puthenvelikkara Infant Jesus Church (Chittaara Palli)
Karottukara St. Antony's Church
Thuruthipuram St. Francis Assissi's Church
Thuruthipuram Japamala Ranji Church
Keezhupadam Salbudhimatha Church
Lourde Matha church Kurisingal

Tourist attractions
Mouth of Chalakkudy river
Malavanapara
Periyar river

Business
Puthenvelikkara is one of the greatest trade centre in North Paravoor taluk. This village is situated in a strategic location which is between Ernakulam district and Thrissur district. Today, more and more people are preferring this beautiful village for building their dream home. The village has a good connectivity to the Airport CIAL as well as North Paravoor, Ernakulam, Kodungalloor, Angamali, chalakkudy town etc. A good number of educational institutions, medical colleges and many other facilities can be easily accessed from this village as they are located within the vicinity of the village area.

History
Puthenvelikkara was a village in Paravur and based on its importance Puthenvelikkara became a Panchayat.

See also
North Paravur
Paravur Taluk
Ernakulam District
Kochi

References

Villages in Ernakulam district